Chapelton is the name of several places:
Chapelton, Devon, England
 Chapelton railway station
Chapelton, Jamaica
Chapelton, Aberdeenshire, Scotland
Chapelton, Port Glasgow, Scotland
Chapelton, South Lanarkshire, Scotland

See also
Chapeltown (disambiguation) 
Chapeltoun, estate in East Ayrshire, Scotland